Vladimir Loginov (born 5 January 1974) is a retired football forward from Kazakhstan. He obtained a total number of 23 caps for the Kazakhstan national football team during his career, scoring two goals.

Career statistics

International goals

References

External links

1974 births
Living people
Kazakhstani footballers
Kazakhstan international footballers
Association football forwards
Kazakhstan Premier League players
FC Aktobe players
Footballers at the 1998 Asian Games
Kazakhstani people of Russian descent
Asian Games competitors for Kazakhstan